Anthony Frederick Holles (born 8 February 1939 in Liverpool, England) is a former British pair skater who competed with Joyce Coates.  They finished tenth at the 1956 Winter Olympics, captured the bronze medal at the 1958 and 1959 European Figure Skating Championships, and came in fourth at the 1959 World Figure Skating Championships.  They retired from competition before the 1960 season, turning professional to take up coaching.

Results
(with Coates)

References

Sports-Reference.com profile

British male pair skaters
Olympic figure skaters of Great Britain
Figure skaters at the 1956 Winter Olympics
1939 births
Living people
Sportspeople from Liverpool
European Figure Skating Championships medalists